R37 may refer to:

Roads 
 R37 expressway (Czech Republic)
 R37 (South Africa)

Other uses 
 R-37 (missile), a Russian missile
 Renard R.37, a Belgian prototype fighter aircraft
 R37: Irritating to respiratory system, a risk phrase